AG3 may refer to:

 AG3 battery, a common button cell battery for consumer electronics
 Heckler & Koch G3, a battle rifle developed in 1956 by Heckler & Koch GmbH
 Artificial Girl 3, the third installment in an adult video game series by Illusion